Eli Dershwitz (born September 23, 1995) is an American left-handed sabre fencer, four-time individual Pan American champion, and two-time Olympian.

In 2014, Dershwitz won the US Men's Saber National Championship, becoming the youngest US senior men's saber championship holder. Dershwitz then won the 2015 Junior World Fencing Championships in saber, becoming the inaugural U.S. men's saber fencer to win a world title. He is a four-time Pan-American Championship title holder, and the 2015 Pan American Games champion in saber. Dershwitz competed in fencing at the 2016 Summer Olympics. He returned to Harvard University as a sophomore, winning individual saber in the 2017 NCAA Fencing Championship and as a junior in the 2018 NCAA Fencing Championship. He won a silver medal in saber at the 2018 World Fencing Championships.

He was ranked #1 in the United States as of February 2018, and was ranked #1 in the world as of July 2018. He was the youngest saber fencer among the world's top 25.

Early life and education
Dershwitz is Jewish, and was born and raised in Sherborn, Massachusetts.  His parents are Renee Goetzler and Mark Dershwitz. His maternal grandparents, both Holocaust survivors, were Ruth (née Schmukler) Goetzler (born in Tarnów, Poland, she survived the Holocaust hidden in a barn by a Polish farmer) and Mark Goetzler (born in Jasło, Poland, he also lived in Samarkand, Uzbekistan). His paternal parents were Arthur Dershwitz and Tillie (née Segel) Dershwitz. He has an older brother (Phil, who fenced for Princeton University) and a twin sister (Sally, who competed in gymnastics and lacrosse).  He attended the Conservative synagogue Temple Israel of Natick, was bar mitzvah in 2008.

Dershwitz played basketball and soccer up until the end of middle school. He attended Dover-Sherborn High School, graduating in 2014.

He was a student at Harvard University, where he majored in history and graduated in 2019. He was a member of the varsity Harvard Crimson fencing team. As a freshman in 2014-15, he was a First Team All-American, All-Ivy League, and finished third at the NCAA Fencing Championships with a 22-2 record. He was the seventh Harvard fencer to compete in the Olympics, with the prior two having been Emily Cross '09 (Team USA) and Noam Mills '12 (Team Israel), who both competed in the 2008 Beijing Olympics.  Dershwitz took off the 2015–16 school year to train full-time for the Olympics. As a sophomore in 2016-17, he was again a First Team All-American, All-Ivy League, and this time he won the NCAA Fencing Championship in men's saber, becoming the first fencer to win an NCAA fencing championship for Harvard since 2007. As a junior in 2017-18, he again won the NCAA Saber Fencing Championship. He became the first Harvard male fencer to win back-to-back NCAA championships, and was again voted an All American.

Fencing career

Dershwitz was ranked number 1 in saber in the United States, and number 10 in the world, as of the summer of 2016.  In March 2016, US Olympic saber coach Zoran Tulum said: "Eli’s world ranking is remarkable... he is the youngest [saber] fencer among the world’s top 25." He was ranked #1 in the world as of July 2018.

He followed his older brother into fencing.  Dershwitz has been coached since 2004 when he was 9 years old by Tulum, at the Zeta Fencing club in Natick, Massachusetts.  Tulum coached the US men's saber team at the 2016 Summer Olympics.

In February 2016, Dershwitz beat Russia's 2015 world champion Alexey Yakimenko at the Warsaw World Cup. In March 2016, while winning the gold medal at the Seoul Grand Prix in South Korea, he defeated 2014 world silver medalist Gu Bon-gil of Korea in the quarterfinals, 2014 world champion Nikolay Kovalev of Russia in the semifinals, and Iranian Mojtaba Abedini in the final.

In February 2017, Dershwitz won the individual saber Ivy League Championship. In March 2017, he won the individual saber in the 2017 NCAA Fencing Championships, and was again named a first-team All-American.  In May 2017, Dershwitz won a silver medal at the Villa de Madrid, his first individual world cup medal. By that time he had already won two gold and three silver team world cup medals from 2014–16, three junior world championships medals, a Pan American Games gold medal in 2015, and a grand prix gold medal in 2016. In June 2017 he won an individual saber silver medal at the 2017 Pan American Fencing Championships. In July 2017 he won the gold medal in saber at the 2017 Maccabiah Games. In November 2017 he won a saber World Cup in Algeria (while he was the youngest of the top 25 saber fencers in the world). '

In February 2018 (while ranked 6th in the world) he beat two-time Olympic champion Áron Szilágyi of Hungary to win the saber fencing World Cup event in Padua, Italy, and in April 2018 he won a bronze medal at a men's saber grand prix in Seoul, South Korea. In February 2019 he won the gold medal at the Men's Saber World Cup in Warsaw, Poland. After his win, he posted on his instagram account: "Amazing and emotional day as my mother told me this morning that my Polish grandparents, who came to America 75 years ago, would be watching over me today."

US Championship competitions
In March 2013, Dershwitz was the top-ranked US junior saber fencer. In April 2014, Dershwitz won the US Men's Saber National Championship, becoming the youngest-ever US senior men's saber champion.  As of July 1, 2016, he was ranked #1 in the United States, ahead of teammate Daryl Homer.

World Championship competitions
Dershwitz was the 2015 Under-20 World Saber Champion.  He was the only American men's saber fencer to win a world title. He is a five-time Junior World Fencing Championships and Cadet World Championships team member.

He won a silver medal at the 2012 Junior World Championships, a bronze medal at the 2013 Junior World Championships, and the gold medal at the 2015 Junior World Fencing Championships—the first title for a US men's saber fencer at the junior world championships.  In March 2013, Dershwitz was the number-two-ranked world junior saber fencer.

In 2013, Dershwitz fenced in men's sabre at the 2013 World Fencing Championships, where he finished 36th after a 15-12 loss to Matyas Szabo (Germany).  He was also the youngest member of the US national team in 2013, at 17 years of age. Dershwitz also competed in men's sabre at the 2014 World Fencing Championships in Kazan, Russia, in men's sabre at the 2015 World Fencing Championships in Moscow, Russia, and in the 2016 Senior Team World Championships in Rio de Janeiro. He won a silver medal in saber at the 2018 World Fencing Championships in China.

Pan American Games and Pan American Championships
Dershwitz is a four-time Pan-American Champion.  He won individual gold medals at the 2014 Pan American Fencing Championships in San Jose, Costa Rica, and the 2015 Pan American Fencing Championships in Santiago, Chile.  He also won team gold medals in the 2013 Pan American Fencing Championships in Cartagena, Colombia, and the 2016 Pan American Fencing Championships in Panama City, Panama.

Dershwitz also won gold medals in both individual and team saber in fencing at the 2015 Pan American Games in Toronto, Canada.

Olympics
Dershwitz competed at the 2016 Rio Summer Olympics, on August 10.  He qualified by being in the top 14 of the FIE adjusted official ranking list, and was the youngest member of the US Olympic fencing team. He said, "I am excited to represent my country... at a sporting event that brings the entire world together in peace." Dershwitz Commented on his rise from a viewer of the Games as a teenager, "just to think that in three short years ... it can go from watching on a computer screen ...  screaming in my pajamas at 3 in the morning to actually being on the biggest stage in sports, it’s so hard to picture.  But now it’s all I think about."

Dershwitz lost to  Seppe van Holsbeke of Belgium in the opening competition round of the Olympics men's sabre, 15-12, who advanced to the Round of 16.

He returned to Harvard University as a sophomore six days following the 2016 Summer Olympics closing ceremony.

He has fenced for the United States in fencing at the 2020 Olympics in Tokyo in 2021, losing in the round of 16 to Kim Jung-Hwan of Korea, who went on to win the bronze medal.

20th Maccabiah Games 2017 

In 2017, Dershwitz represented the United States, fencing sabre at the 2017 Maccabiah Games held in Israel. He was awarded the honor of being a banner bearer during the Opening Ceremony, and came back with two gold medals. He won the individual men's saber event, beating Harvard teammate Philippe Guy in the finals. In the team event, Dershwitz competed alongside Philippe Guy, Ben Stone, and Matt Rothenberg. They beat Hungary in the semi-finals, and defeated their hosts, Israel, in the finals.

See also
List of select Jewish fencers

References

External links
Eli Dershwitz official Facebook page

1995 births
Living people
American male sabre fencers
Harvard Crimson fencers
Jewish male sabre fencers
American people of Polish-Jewish descent
Jewish American sportspeople
Competitors at the 2017 Maccabiah Games
Maccabiah Games gold medalists for the United States
Maccabiah Games medalists in fencing
American people of Uzbekistani-Jewish descent
Fencers at the 2016 Summer Olympics
Olympic fencers of the United States
People from Sherborn, Massachusetts
Fencers at the 2015 Pan American Games
Pan American Games gold medalists for the United States
Pan American Games bronze medalists for the United States
American twins
Twin sportspeople
Pan American Games medalists in fencing
World Fencing Championships medalists
Medalists at the 2015 Pan American Games
Sportspeople from Middlesex County, Massachusetts
Fencers at the 2020 Summer Olympics